This page includes the discography of the Serbian artist Jelena Tomašević.

Studio albums

Singles

Music videos 
 "Jutro" (2005)
 "Oro" (2008)
 "Košava" (2008)
 "Okeani" (2008)

References

External links 

Discographies of Serbian artists
Folk music discographies
Pop music discographies